Mike Morrell (born October 14, 1952) is an American politician who served in the California State Senate from 2014 to 2020. He was elected as a Republican to the California State Assembly in 2010, and won a special election to the State Senate in March 2014. Prior to serving in the state legislature, he was a real estate broker.

Early life 
Morrell was born in Covina, California.

Education
Morrell has a BA in Business from the University of La Verne.

Career
As a state assemblyman, Morrell represented the  40th district, encompassing part of San Bernardino County. He served as the Vice Chair of the Labor and Employment Committee and a member of the Budget, the Banking and Finance, the Environmental Safety and Toxic Materials, the Jobs, Economic Development, and the Economy, and the Joint Sunset Review Committees.

In March 2014, Morrell won a special election and became a Republican member of California State Senate for District 23. Morrell succeeded Bill Emmerson, who resigned. Morrell was sworn in on April 3, 2014 to serve District 23.

Memberships
Legislative Committee for the Citrus Valley Association of Realtor
Advisory Board to the Pacific Justice Institute

Electoral history

2016 • 2014 • 2012 • 2010

2016 California State Senate election

2014 California State Senate special election

2012 California State Assembly election

2010 California State Assembly election

Awards 
 2014 Henry J. Mello award. Presented at 34th Annual Legislative Session of the California Senior Legislature.

Personal life 
Morrell's wife is Joanie Morrell. They have three children. Morrell and his family live in Rancho Cucamonga, California.

References

External links 
 Mike Morrell at ballotpedia.org
 
 Campaign website
 Join California Mike Morrell
 

1952 births
Living people
Republican Party California state senators
Republican Party members of the California State Assembly
People from Covina, California
People from Rancho Cucamonga, California
University of La Verne alumni
American real estate brokers
21st-century American politicians